Milan Smith (April 27, 1923 – May 2, 2001) was an American actor and stuntman. He was known for playing the role of Kyle in the American western television series Rawhide.

Life and career 
Smith was born in South Dakota, where he was raised on a Sioux reservation. He served the Pacific in World War II. Smith worked for almost 20 years as a stunt double. His first appearances were in 1951 in the western television series The Lone Ranger. While appearing in the show he became friends with the actor Jay Silverheels, who played the role of Tonto. Smith appeared on numerous television westerns including, Gunsmoke, Bonanza, The Wild Wild West, Tombstone Territory, The Rifleman, The Virginian, Maverick, The Life and Legend of Wyatt Earp, Death Valley Days, Branded, Wanted: Dead or Alive, Bat Masterson, Tales of Wells Fargo and Wagon Train.

Smith was a regular cast member on the western television series Rawhide from 1959 to 1960, playing the role of Kyle. 

Smith also appeared in films including Duel on the Mississippi, Masterson of Kansas, Rio Bravo, The Adventures of Bullwhip Griffin, Stagecoach to Dancers' Rock, Jesse James vs. the Daltons, Here Come the Marines, Waco, The Toughest Gun in Tombstone, Cattle Queen of Montana and Escape from Fort Bravo. He retired in 1969, last appearing in the film Change of Habit. 

After retiring, Smith became a horse trainer. When his friend Jay Silverheels died from complications of pneumonia in March 1980 at the age of 62, Smith named a horse "Hi Ho Silverheels" in his honour.

Death 
Smith died in May 2001 in Victorville, California, at the age of 78.

References

External links 

Rotten Tomatoes profile

1923 births
2001 deaths
People from South Dakota
Male actors from South Dakota
American male film actors
American male television actors
American stunt performers
20th-century American male actors
Male Western (genre) film actors
Western (genre) television actors
American horse trainers